The hooded wheatear (Oenanthe monacha) is a wheatear, a small insectivorous passerine that was formerly classed as a member of the thrush family Turdidae, but is now more generally considered to be an Old World flycatcher, Muscicapidae.

This 15.5–17 cm long bird is a resident breeder in unvegetated desert from eastern Egypt through the Arabian peninsula used to be in UAE and Oman a scarce breeder in Hajar mountains to Iran and Pakistan. It occurs annually in Cyprus on passage. The nest is built in a rock crevice, and 3-6 eggs is the normal clutch.

In summer the male hooded wheatear is a white and black bird. The white crown and belly contrast with the black face, back and throat. The tail and rump are white with black central tail feathers.

The female is brown, becoming somewhat paler below. The tail pattern is similar to the male's, but the ground colour is buff rather than white.

Hooded wheatear feeds on insects, often taken in the air. Its call is a whistled vit, and the song is a harsh chattering.

Gallery

References

hooded wheatear
Birds of the Middle East
Birds of Pakistan
hooded wheatear